The Windsor Bridge, officially called the Hawkesbury River Bridge, Windsor, a beam bridge across the Hawkesbury River, is located in  in north-western Sydney, New South Wales, Australia. The bridge was built in 1874. On 18 May 2020, the replacement bridge was opened to traffic within Windsor, NSW.

History 
The Windsor Bridge was a significant contributor to the early economic contributions of the Hawkesbury and Central West regions, and more than 20,000 vehicles per day still use this crossing, its engineering significance in having stood the test of time and flood is obvious. The area is also noted to contain an early wharf.

The area leading to Windsor Bridge is called Thompson Square.  Established in 1795 as the government domain and military precinct of the Hawkesbury outpost settlement, early convict-built clay brick drains that have been the subject of Hawkesbury historical knowledge since 1814 are extant.  Many old-time local residents have spoken of traversing the 1814 convict built brick barrel drains in years gone by.  With the Windsor Bridge Replacement Project underway, this significant and complex network of a potentially unique colonial drainage system has had significant portions removed within the project area by the NSW RMS.  These drains have been exposed, some removed. A number of drains have been protected by encasing within polystyrene under a two-storey-high concrete bridge abutment during construction.

Heritage listing
The Windsor Bridge was listed on the heritage and conservation register of the Roads & Maritime Services on 21 October 2004 with the following statement of significance:

Bridge replacement
In December 2013, the Government of New South Wales gave planning approval to the construction of a new bridge to replace the existing 1874 Windsor Bridge that, due to safety reasons, have been disputed. The old bridge is to be demolished after the new bridge opens. The approach road to the new bridge is proposed to be built along one side of the Thompson Square, Australia's oldest public square on a currently existing road. The new bridge proposal is objected to by in excess of 45,000 people, on the grounds that it will keep and increase heavy traffic in a historic town centre, and destroys the town's character and heritage. Some who favour the proposal claim the new bridge would greatly reduce traffic congestion in the area, in direct contradiction to quite a number of government traffic studies and documents. In October 2015, a legal challenge to stop the new bridge failed.

According to NSW Roads & Maritime Services, the replacement three-lane bridge is expected to provide insignificant improvements in traffic flow and flood mitigation. Some local residents speculate that a reason for the proposed bridge replacement was sand extraction on the Richmond Lowlands facilitated by the new bridge with wider spaced pylons and a slight height increases to allow barges to pass underneath. Documents show that there was "high level political interference in the planning approval process" and that the Department of Planning changed from opposing the project to supporting it in less than a month following the political interference.  In a submission to a NSW Legislative Council inquiry, it is speculated that the disclosed political interference was largely orchestrated by Bart Bassett, a former Member for Hawkesbury and a former Mayor of the City of Hawkesbury, who was Mayor of Hawkesbury at the time the high level political interference occurred and who was found to have illegally solicited political donations from Buildev in 2010. In 2014 he was asked to step down or face expulsion amid the corruption allegations that were being investigated by the ICAC.

On 18 May, 2020 the replacement bridge was opened to traffic within Windsor, NSW.

In March 2021, the bridge was submerged along with other areas, during the 2021 eastern Australia floods.

In March 2022 the bridge was again flooded during the 2022 eastern Australia floods, and once again during a major flood event in July 2022.

See also

 Historic bridges of New South Wales
 List of bridges in Sydney
 March 2021 Australian floods

References

External links
 
 
 
 

Beam bridges
Bridges completed in 1874
Bridges in Sydney
Hawkesbury River
Road bridges in New South Wales
1874 establishments in Australia
Windsor, New South Wales